The 2022 Women's Twenty20 Cup, known for sponsorship reasons as the 2022 Vitality Women's County T20, was the 13th edition of the Women's Twenty20 Cup, an English women's cricket Twenty20 domestic competition. It took place in April and May 2022, with 35 teams taking part, organised into eight regional groups. There was no overall winner, with Lancashire, Worcestershire, Warwickshire, Suffolk, Leicestershire and Rutland, Sussex, Middlesex and Devon winning their individual groups.

Format
Teams played matches within a series of regional divisions, playing three matchdays, with most matchdays consisting of two matches between the same teams. Matches were played using a Twenty20 format. The group stages were followed by a group Finals Day, played on 8 May. In Group 1, the top four teams qualified for Finals Day (with the other three teams playing off at a different venue), whilst in Groups 2 to 7 all four teams qualified, with first playing fourth and second playing third in the semi-finals.

The groups worked on a points system with positions being based on total points. Points were awarded as follows:

Win: 4 points. 
Tie: 2 points. 
Loss: 0 points.
Abandoned/Cancelled: 1 point.

Teams
The teams were divided into eight regional groups. Group 1 consisted of 7 teams, whilst Groups 2 to 7 consisted of 4 teams apiece.

Standings
Note: Teams highlighted in  gold were champions of their group, by virtue of winning on Finals Day.

Group 1

 advances to 1A Finals Day

Group 2

Group 3

Group 4

Group 5

Group 6

Group 7

Group 8

Fixtures
Source:

Group 1

Group stage

Finals Day

Note: Cumbria withdrew from the Group 1B Finals Day, meaning that North Representative XI and North East Warriors played a double-header matchday.

Group 2

Group stage

Finals Day

Group 3

Group stage

Finals Day

Group 4

Group stage

Finals Day

Group 5

Group stage

Finals Day

Group 6

Group stage

Finals Day

Group 7

Group stage

Finals Day
Note: Huntingdonshire withdrew from the Group 7 Finals Day, meaning that the three remaining teams played each other once on Finals Day.

Group 8

Group stage

Finals Day

Statistics

Most runs

Source: Play-Cricket

Most wickets

Source: Play-Cricket

References

Women's Twenty20 Cup
2022 in English women's cricket
cricket